Stade Municipal de Guider is a multi-use stadium in Guider, Cameroon. It is currently used mostly for football matches. It serves as a home ground of Espérance FC. The stadium holds 2,000 people.

References

Football venues in Cameroon